When Four Do the Same (German: Wenn vier dasselbe tun) is a 1917 German silent comedy drama film directed by Ernst Lubitsch and starring Ossi Oswalda, Emil Jannings and Margarete Kupfer. Lubitsch himself plays a book shop employee who falls in love with Jannings' daughter. The film was a key transitional work in Lubitsch's career, as he began to produce films with greater depth than his early light comedies.

The film was shot at the Tempelhof Studios in Berlin. It premièred in Berlin on 16 November 1917 at the Union-Theatre am Nollendorfplatz and at the UT Kufürstendamm (Filmbühne Wien).

Cast
 Emil Jannings as Segetoff
 Ossi Oswalda as Segetoffs Tochter
 Margarete Kupfer as Frau Lange, Buchhändlerin
 Fritz Schulz as Tobias Schmalzstich, Lehrling
 Victor Janson as Tanzlehrer
 Ernst Lubitsch

References

Bibliography
 Eyman, Scott. Ernst Lubitsch: Laughter in Paradise. Johns Hopkins University Press, 2000.

External links

1917 films
Films of the German Empire
German silent feature films
1917 comedy-drama films
German comedy-drama films
Films directed by Ernst Lubitsch
German black-and-white films
Silent comedy-drama films
1910s German films
Films shot at Tempelhof Studios
1910s German-language films